Popolarismo is the term Don Luigi Sturzo used to describe his political doctrine that formed the ideological basis for the Italian Popular Party and later Christian Democracy. In the Papal Encyclical Graves de Communi, (1901) Pope Leo XIII did not want Christian Democracy to enter the political sphere, and restricted it to the social action. Sturzo developed Popularism as an alternative means of political action, which had an ideological focus on the people. As one academic notes:

In this European context, Popularism helped Catholics come to accept democratic institutions, alongside inspiring the French Popular Democratic Party (formed 1924), the Spanish Partido Social Popular, and the People and Freedom group (formed 1936), which Sturzo helped form in London. Sturzo outlined his conception of popularism as follows:In describing Popularism, Sturzo refers to the political program of the Italian Popular Party, which called for; The state to recognize natural communities, such as the family, the classes and the communes, proportional representation and universal suffrage for women, for an elected senate to represent the mangers, trade unions and academics, the decentralization of power and greater regional autonomy, freedom of religion, the demonopolisation of education, and pro workers legislation generally.

The Popular Democratic Party's most significant theorist was Marcel Prélot, who was Struzo's French Translator. He said the Popular Democratic Party:
Academics have noted the role of Popularism in outlining the Christian Democratic notions of the people, and democracy. 

The notion of the people is that the people extend beyond the working class, and actually encompasses the whole of society. But it is not a mass aggregation of individuals; the people is an organically unified community, but also internally diverse community. Christian Democratic parties have invoked the people when naming themselves “popular”  or “People’s Parties”. In this invocation, Christian democratic parties aim for two things. The first is to work towards a policy that is for the good of all the members of society as opposed to parties that promote the good of a specific group (i.e. class). The second refers to a society where the people live in a kind of harmony and where people and groups are interested in and care about each other. In practice, the specific religious nature of the Christian democratic parties has enabled them to cut across the class divide.

The notion of the democracy that derives from this reflects the socio-economic diversity of people by advocating inclusive forms of democracy. This has led to the Christian Democratic call for Proportional Representation. Christian Democrats have also called for Pillarization, which where representatives is based on a vast array of complex social organizations ingrained in the fabric of society. Often, these organizations play an intermediary role to Democracy.

In light of the 100th Anniversary of the Establishment of the Italian Popular Party, the Luigi Sturzo Institute has aimed to increase the general knowledge about the party, and noted that:

Modern Christian Democrats have called for Popularism. After a meeting with Pope Francis and Donald Tusk, Charles Michel noted the differences between Popularism (popolarismo) and Populism (populismo):Donald Tusk, would later refer to this meeting at the European People's Party congress  in Zagreb, and call for "responsible popularity" over "irresponsible populism".

See also 
 Populares
 Proportional Representation
 Pillarization

Citations & References

External Links 

 Il "Popolarismo" in Vol. 5 - Scritti storico-politici (1926-1949), p. 30-38

 Reforma Statle E Indirizza Politica (1920-1922) in Il Partito Popolare Italiano
Christian democracy
Political ideologies